Crom Castle (Irish: Caisleán na Croime) is a country house on the shores of Upper Lough Erne in County Fermanagh, Northern Ireland, the seat of the Earls Erne. 
Standing within a  estate, and within a formal garden, the castle is built in stone. A central battlemented tower includes the main entrance, and there are also smaller towers to one side. It stands apart from the ruins of Old Crom Castle, of which two towers, some walls, and a ha-ha survive, and near them two ancient yew trees, believed to be at least 800 years old.

History
Like many Ulster country estates, the first house at Crom was built by a Scottish planter at the beginning of the 17th century. In 1611, as part of the Plantation of Ulster, Michael Balfour, the Laird of Mountwhinney, constructed a house on the lough shore opposite Inishfendra Island. Following the usual pattern for a Plantation castle, the Old Castle at Crom was built of lime and stone and enclosed within a bawn. 

In 1689, the Old Crom Castle survived two Jacobite sieges during the Williamite War in Ireland. The Crichton family under Colonel Abraham Crichton   held out against the Jacobites until reinforcements from Enniskillen arrived. The local events concluded at the Battle of Newtownbutler when a Williamite force of less than 1500 Enniskillen troops captured and killed as many as 3000 of James II's troops. The battle took place at the townland of Kilgarrett 1 mile south of Newtownbutler. 

In 1764, the Old Castle was destroyed by a domestic fire. In 1840, the present day Crom Castle was built, designed by the English architect Edward Blore. 

In 1997, Henry Crichton, 6th Earl Erne, gave the estate to the National Trust to manage. The castle remains the private property of John Crichton, 7th Earl Erne, but can be hired. 

Crom Estate was the location of a great classic yacht and steamboat regatta in August 2010 when the races of the 1890s were recreated in Trial Bay using Norfolk Broads One-Designs (brown boats), Lough Erne Fairies, Fife One Designs from Anglesea and a pair of Colleens. Racing took place on Upper Lough Erne within sight of the castle, and the boats moored each evening off the boathouse in Crom Bay.

Crom Castle Loyal Orange Lodge 1219 is a lodge of the Orange Order based at the Crom Estate, occupying the former laundry. It dates from the time of John Crichton, 4th Earl Erne, Grand Master of the Grand Orange Lodge of Ireland from 1886 until his death in 1914.

Boathouse
The castle has a boathouse on the shore of Lough Erne, rebuilt by George Sudden in 1841 in a Tudor style. It has arched doors and windows at ground-floor level. Upstairs is a room which overlooks the lake. 

Before the 20th century, much travelling in County Fermanagh was most easily done on Lough Erne, and visiting guests would often arrive at the boathouse. Now empty and unused, excrpt by the Earl of Erne, it was once the home of the Erne Yacht Club.

The West Wing
The castle is privately owned by the Earl of Erne, but accommodation in the West Wing can be rented at all times of the year.

In popular culture
The 2013 BBC television production of P. G. Wodehouse's Blandings was filmed on location at Crom Castle. The series portrays the fictional Blandings Castle in Shropshire.

Gallery

See also
 List of castles in Northern Ireland

References

External links

National Trust - Crom Estate
Virtual Tour of Crom Castle Demesne Northern Ireland - Virtual Visit Northern Ireland

Castles in County Fermanagh
Townlands of County Fermanagh
Grade A listed buildings
Archaeological sites in County Fermanagh